Blastodacna pyrigalla, the pear shoot gall moth or pear fruit borer, is a moth in the family Elachistidae. It was described by Yang in 1977. It is found in Korea and China.

The larvae feed within galls on Prunus persica.

References

Moths described in 1977
Blastodacna